Coundon is a predominantly residential suburb in north-west Coventry, West Midlands, England.

Along with neighbouring Keresley, it was originally a village in the Warwickshire countryside, but by the 1930s had been incorporated into the city of Coventry, when mass housebuilding took place to accommodate the city's growing population.

From 1951 to 2005, Coundon was the location of the Browns Lane Jaguar car factory, which for its first 47 years was the carmaker's only plant. Upon its closure in 2005, production of cars was split between factories in Castle Bromwich and Halewood, and the Browns Lane plant was largely demolished in 2008, although part of the site remains under Jaguar ownership, and some is now used by a vehicle interiors manufacturer.

Education
Several schools are situated in the suburb of Coundon; Primary Schools - Coundon, Hollyfast, Moseley and Christ the King (separated into different sites for Infant and Junior schools) and Coundon Court Secondary.

The playing fields of Bablake School, an independent school, are located within Coundon. The former Barkers' Butts School which stood in Banks Road in Coundon has been demolished although its history is well documented on the internet, and the original Moseley Primary School has also been demolished but replaced with a new one.

Politics
Coundon is split across two wards, Sherbourne ward to the South West and Bablake ward to the north. Three councillors represent each ward, three of whom are members of the Labour Party. In Bablake ward, there are two Conservative Party Councillors and one Independent.
In general elections Coundon falls within the constituency of Coventry North West, which returns one MP to parliament; currently Taiwo Owatemi of the Labour Party.

References

Suburbs of Coventry